The 1932 Massachusetts gubernatorial election was held on November 8, 1932.

Incumbent Democratic Governor Joseph B. Ely was re-elected to a second term in office. This was the only election between 1910 and 1944 in which the Democratic candidate received a majority of the popular vote.

Democratic primary

Governor

Candidates
 Joseph B. Ely, incumbent Governor

Results
Governor Ely was unopposed for re-nomination.

Lt. Governor

Candidates
Edward P. Barry, former Lieutenant Governor
David J. Brickley
Raymond A. Fitzgerald
William I. Hennessey
Francis E. Kelly, Member of the Boston City Council
John F. Malley
Michael C. O'Neill
John E. Swift, law associate of Senator David I. Walsh and Supreme Director of the Knights of Columbus

Results

Republican primary

Governor

Candidates
Walter E. Brownell, Corporation Counsel of Boston
Frank A. Goodwin, former Registrar of Motor Vehicles and candidate for Governor in 1928
E. Mark Sullivan, attorney
William S. Youngman, Lieutenant Governor of Massachusetts

Results

Lt. Governor

Candidates
Gaspar G. Bacon, President of the Massachusetts Senate
Chester I. Campbell, Member of the Governor's Council

Results

General election

Results

See also
 1931–1932 Massachusetts legislature

References

Bibliography

Governor
1932
Massachusetts
November 1932 events in the United States